Boy Wonder is a 2010 American psychological thriller about vigilantism.  The film was written and directed by Michael Morrissey and stars Caleb Steinmeyer, Zulay Henao, Bill Sage, Tracy Middendorf, Daniel Stewart Sherman, Chuck Cooper, and James Russo.

Plot 
A young boy named Sean Donovan lives with his mother and abusive alcoholic father. A carjacker attacks his family one night, which results in his mother's murder. Afterward, his father Terry moves them to a nicer neighborhood.

Ten years later, Sean is an excellent student but is antisocial and distant from his peers. He sees abuse in everyday arguments among those around him. He trains in self-defense skills and begins to carry a weapon at night. During an attempted mugging, he kills a man. An eyewitness statement draws the interest of Teresa Ames, who has recently been promoted to the NYPD homicide division. She takes an interest in Sean, who frequents the police station as he searches for the information on his mother's murderer.

Teresa befriends him and learns about his life, including his interest in a toxin named Tricelaron. He insists it was part of his research for a chemistry paper. She also finds that he speaks fluent Chinese after he angrily berates rude staff in a Chinese restaurant. Later on, Sean defends a young woman who is being abused by her pimp. He fights with the pimp before shooting and killing him.

While riding the train, Sean encounters an unkempt man under the influence who is verbally threatening a Chinese family and other passengers of the train. In Chinese, Sean tells the boy to tell his family to leave the car. He puts on black face paint and brutally beats the man with brass knuckles. Teresa and her partner, who happen to be on the train, investigate, but Sean gets away without being identified.

Teresa learns that the perpetrator spoke fluent Chinese and suspects Sean. Despite her supervisor's warning not to investigate Sean, she persists. Finally, the now-retired supervisor tells Teresa that the young Sean was able to clearly identify his mother's murderer from a photo book, but his father Terry convinced him to change his story. The murderer is identified as Larry Childs, a contract killer, whom Teresa arrested six months ago, but has just managed to get a two-year sentence, and entry into the witness protection program through a plea bargain.

As Sean walks down the street, he sees parents disciplining their children, but they are inflated in his mind to abusive violence. During a school party, Sean has a violent flashback of his mother's murder, and recalls hearing the killer call his father by his old boxing nickname. Enraged by the memory, he savagely beats a fellow student who has been harassing a female friend. Teresa, while investigating Sean, finds a picture at his house of Terry and the murderer Larry together and realizes that they knew each other before the attack.

Sean believes that Terry staged the attack to obtain his mother's life insurance. Sean confronts his father, but Terry adamantly denies he killed his own wife. Convinced of his father's guilt, Sean shoots and kills Terry. Teresa finds Sean, but he says someone broke into their home and killed his father. Teresa sees the murder weapon and disposes of it.

Sometime later, Sean sends a letter to Larry, who is currently serving his two-year sentence. In the letter Sean expresses his forgiveness to Larry but pleads with him to reveal the truth of his mother's murder: was his father involved? He offers a simple way to reply and includes a self-addressed, empty envelope, a red stamp, and a black stamp. He asks Larry to use the black stamp if his father is guilty or the red stamp if his father is innocent. Larry licks the stamp and after handing it to a guard, falls to the floor of his jail cell, unable to breathe. Sean has laced the stamp glue with Tricelaron and Larry dies. When Sean receives the letter, he stares at the red stamp it bears, indicating that his father was in fact innocent of the murder and Sean had killed him for nothing despite the fact that he was abusive.

Cast 
 Caleb Steinmeyer as Sean Donovan
 Zulay Henao as Teresa Ames
 James Russo as Larry Childs
 Bill Sage as Terry Donovan
 Tracy Middendorf as Mary Donovan
 Chuck Cooper as Bill Baldwin

Production 
Cinematographer Chris LaVasseur used a RED One camera to shoot the film.  He used the digital intermediate process to tweak the colors according to director Michael Morrissey's desires.  Morrissey, who had never worked with a RED One camera before, was initially skeptical, as he found the colors to be too saturated.  LaVasseur was able to demonstrate to him that this could be easily corrected.  Filming took place in Canarsie, Brooklyn, New York.

Release 
Boy Wonder premiered at the Rhode Island Film Festival.  It was released on DVD in the United States on November 8, 2011.

Reception 
Review aggregator Rotten Tomatoes reports an approval rating of 50% based on 6 reviews from critics; the average rating is 6.4/10. Ronnie Scheib of Variety wrote, "Morrissey displays a flair for moody atmospherics as his protagonist wanders Gotham's streets and subways at night, but the film relies too heavily on cryptic flashbacks and deliberate gaps in the narrative to create suspense, revealing rather than fleshing out connective tissue." Kirk Honeycutt of The Hollywood Reporter described it as an intriguing and smart exploration of vigilantism that could become a cult film. Roger Ebert of the Chicago Sun-Times rated it 3.5/4 stars and wrote, "In a genre populated with formulas and dreck, Boy Wonder is an ambitious exception, well-made, drawing us in." Jeannette Catsoulis of The New York Times wrote, "Despite its aura of rebellious cool, Boy Wonder is as frigid and empty as Sean’s vengeful heart." J. R. Jones of the Chicago Reader wrote, "Visually and rhetorically, this is indistinguishable from a network cop show."

References

External links 
 
 

2010 films
2010 psychological thriller films
American crime thriller films
American vigilante films
Films about the New York City Police Department
Films about domestic violence
Films set in New York City
Films shot in New York City
2010s English-language films
2010s American films